Kris Kaspersky (born Nikolay Likhachev, November 2, 1976 – February 18, 2017) was a Russian hacker, writer and IT security researcher.

Early years

Kris Kaspersky was born on November 2, 1976, in the village of Uspenskoye, Krasnodar Krai, and at birth was named Nikolay. Being just a few weeks old he suffered a brain stroke, which came as a result of injection of calcium chloride, mistakenly made by a doctor. Brain tissue was partly damaged leading to minor autism. At the age of seven he made his first working radio. While studying at the elementary school he owned his first computer – Pravetz 8D, Bulgarian clone of British  Oric Atmos with the documentation in Bulgarian language. The computer required connection to a tape recorder and a color TV set. For this computer Nikolay developed his first computer game.

His next computer, Electronika BK-0010, helped Kris to master assembly. The third computer was ZX Spectrum, the fourth one was Agat. Except for his birthday, Kris does not remember exact dates and chronology of events, he reconstructs them based on computer models he had at various periods of his life.

He graduated from high school with a silver medal. Kris was a good student, and there were only excellent marks in his certificate, however, according to Kris, to get a gold medal one needed to give bribes to local officials. He entered Taganrog University of Radio Engineering with a specialization in "Design of microcontrollers" without entrance exam. Although he went down without taking even first end-of-semester exams because "students hardly had a possibility to program" and returned to his native village. In the next year, he entered the university again "to calm mom" and again he went down. In those years Kris had IBM PC with 20 mb disk and color monitor. In cooperation with student Shurik, they organized a service of system administration in Taganrog. Some time later his companion absconded with the money. Kris Kaspersky had to give the remaining money and the computer to racketeers and returned to the native village to his parents.

Then Kris made attempts to reopen the business with a trader from Armavir, took trips to Krasnodar and Rostov. Finally, Kris ended up in the capital.

Publications

The first article written by Kris was published when he was still in school. It was published by "Astrologer” magazine, and the article itself was devoted to astronomy. In 1998 Kris began to contribute actively to conferences of FidoNet RU.HACKER. Dmitry Sadchenko noted his posts and arranged him a meeting with the representatives of publishing house "Solon-Press". In 1999 "Solon-Press" published the first book of Kris Kaspersky "Technique and philosophy of hacker attacks" with 50 000 rubles of author's fee. Desktop publisher specialist Sergey Tarasov recalls:

A total of 16 books had been published by 2008, including several translations into English. The books were dedicated to data protection and program optimization, computer virus and disassembling. Among these books there's also "Weatherlore Encyclopedia". Kris's interest lies in the field of computers and astronomy. Some of his articles and forum topics concern telescopes and observation of the starry sky. Along with the books Kris contributes to such magazines as "System administrator", "Byte", "Astrologer", "Hacker". The chief editor of "Hacker" magazine Nikita Kislitsin said:

Recently Kris Kaspersky expressed the idea to leave Russia. And, in order to increase the audience, to start writing books originally in English. Besides Kris Kaspersky had started his English blog. In late October 2008 he made a presentation on a fundamentally new holes in Intel processors, suitable for remote capture of multiple servers at a conference Hack in the Box in Kuala Lumpur.

Endeavor Security and McAfee

Until recently Kris Kaspersky lived an isolated way of life in his native village. Since June 2008, he worked remotely on Endeavor Security, engaged in security of computers and networks. In 2009, McAfee acquired Endeavor Security.

Since 2008 Kris has been living and working in the United States. He worked for Check Point as a security expert.

Some facts

In order to avoid any confusion with antivirus creator Eugene Kaspersky, he spelled his penname differently in Russian. His penname "myschh" was chosen owing to the novel "Dune" which is a great favorite of his (Kris often used quotations from the novel, in particular, in his first book "Technique and philosophy of hacker attacks"). The name of the protagonist of the novel is Muad'Dib, which stands for a desert mouse. Kris Kaspersky penname is not a derivative from any other word and it has no relevance to Eugene Kaspersky. Kris named himself after Casper the friendly ghost from his favorite cartoon and Kris Kelmi, whose music, nevertheless, myschh never listened to.
Kris was very lean. He spoke with a southern accent, sometimes swallowed and distorted words, softened endings of the verbs. He wore long hair and beard. He was not fussed about clothing. 
Kaspersky described his native village this way: "Dedicated ten megabits internet channel".

Injury and death 
On February 10, 2017, Kris Kaspersky (Nikolay Likhachev) was critically injured in a hard landing after sky diving: "A sky diver who took a hard landing at Skydive DeLand remains in intensive care and is unable to communicate, a nurse at Halifax Health Medical Center said Monday. The sky diver, 40-year-old Nikolay Likhachev, suffered a compound fracture to his left leg and a head injury, an incident report released Monday by DeLand police states. The report states that Likhachev had completed 200 jumps, most of them at Skydive DeLand. Likhachev […] was injured Friday just before 9:15 a.m."

Kris Kaspersky was taken off life support and died from his wounds a week later on February 18, 2017.

Bibliography

 Technique and philosophy of hacker attacks. 
 Thought pattern – IDA disassembler. 
 Technique of network attacks. 
 Fundamental principles of hacking. Inverse assembling mastership. 
 Sketch-book of a computer virus researcher. 
 Weather lore encyclopedia. Predicting weather by local signes
 Hacker Disassembling Uncovered, 
 Shellcoder's Programming Uncovered, 
 Data Recovery Tips & Solutions: Windows, Linux, and BSD, 
 CD Cracking Uncovered Protection Against Unsanctioned, 
 CD Cracking Uncovered: Protection Against Unsanctioned CD Copying, 
 Hacker Debugging Uncovered, 
 Code Optimization: Effective Memory Usage,

Magazines, to which Kris Kaspersky contributed
 «BYTE Russia»
 «System administrator»
 «Hacker»
 «Hacker-specialist»
 «IT specialist»
 «Programmer»
 «Computerra»
 «Mobi»

See also
 Assembler
 Programmer
 Hacker

References

Notes

Further reading

Articles by Kris Kaspersky on IT
 Articles in "System administrator" magazine – Yandex and Google search
 Articles in "Hacker" magazine – Yandex and Google search. See also list of articles (not a complete one) on "Hacker" magazine website 
 Articles in "Komputerra" magazine: List of articles
 Articles in "Home PC" Google search
 Fighting viruses: the experience of counter-terrorist operations, article in Russian

Articles by Kris Kaspersky on astronomy
 Capabilities of telescope ZRT-457 and monocular MP20х60, article in Russian
 Source of the Universe, article in Russian

External links
 «Good hacker», article in Russian magazine "Big city»
 Official website of Kris Kaspersky  (Not constantly available)
 Hacker Kris Kaspersky found holes in Intel processors, article in Russian magazine Lenta.ru dated July 15, 2008 
 

1976 births
2017 deaths
People from Uspensky District
Russian computer programmers
Russian technology writers
Writers about computer security
Hackers